Raj Sinha is an Indian politician and member of the Bharatiya Janata Party. Sinha is a member of the Jharkhand Legislative Assembly from the Dhanbad constituency in Dhanbad district, Jharkhand.

References 

People from Dhanbad
Bharatiya Janata Party politicians from Jharkhand
Members of the Jharkhand Legislative Assembly
Living people
Jharkhand MLAs 2014–2019
Year of birth missing (living people)